Dominik Preisler (born 20 September 1995) is a Czech professional footballer who plays for FC Slovan Liberec. He made his league debut for the club as a substitute in a 4–0 win against Teplice in November 2015.

Career statistics

References

External links

Czech footballers
1995 births
Living people
Association football defenders
FK Dukla Prague players
FC Vysočina Jihlava players
Czech First League players
Czech National Football League players
FK Mladá Boleslav players
FC Slovan Liberec players